Duncan Canal is a volcanic field located in the middle of the Alaska Panhandle, United States. It contains pahoehoe and aa lava flows overlying glacial till at Kupreanof Island. Basaltic lava flows within the Duncan Canal volcanic field are both subaerial and submarine.

References

Landforms of Petersburg Borough, Alaska
Volcanic fields of Alaska